The Salto Grande is a waterfall on the Paine River, after the Nordenskjöld Lake, within the Torres del Paine National Park in Chile. In the vicinity of Salto Grande are a variety of natural vegetation forms as well as certain wildlife species, including the wild guanaco.

See also 
 Lake Sarmiento

Notes 
 C. Michael Hogan. 2008. Guanaco: Lama guanicoe, GlobalTwitcher.com, ed. N. Strömberg
 Haas Mroue, Kristina Schreck and Michael Luongo. 2005. Frommer's Argentina & Chile, third edition, Published by John Wiley & Sons,

References

External links 
 UCAR Digital Image Library photo, Salto Grande, Chile

Waterfalls of Chile
Landforms of Magallanes Region
Torres del Paine National Park